Forty-three men from the Indiana Territory were elected to attend a constitutional convention to consider statehood for Indiana. The delegates convened at Corydon, the territorial capital, from June 10 through June 29, 1816. On June 11 the delegation passed a resolution (34 to 8) to proceed with the task of writing the state's first constitution and forming a state government. An Enabling Act, which President James Madison signed into law on April 19, 1816, provided for the election of the delegates that took place on May 13, 1816. The delegation was apportioned among thirteen counties in the territory and based on each county's population.

Jonathan Jennings, an elected delegate from Clark County, presided over the convention; William Hendricks, although he was not an elected delegate, served as the convention's secretary. The delegation adopted the state constitution with a simply majority vote (33 to 8). It went into effect on June 29, 1816.

The convention's elected delegates were:

Ideas

References
 
 
 </*

External links
 Members Of Indiana's 1816 Constitutional Convention, Indiana Historical Bureau

History of Indiana
Indiana
Indiana
Delegates to the 1816 Indiana constitutional convention